Nassodonta is a genus of brackish water snails, gastropod mollusks in the family Nassariidae. 

Nassodonta insignis is the type species of the genus Nassodonta.

Taxonomy
Arthur Adams classified the genus Nassodonta within family Buccinidae in 1867. The genus Nassodonta is traditionally placed in the subfamily Nassariinae of the family Nassariidae since 19th century and it was placed into the newly established subfamily Anentominae in 2017.

Species
Species within the genus Nassodonta include:
 Nassodonta annesleyi (Benson, 1861)
 Nassodonta insignis H. Adams, 1867 - type species of the genus Nassodonta
Species brought into synonymy
 Nassodonta dorri (Wattebled, 1886): synonym of Oligohalinophila dorri (Wattebled, 1886)
 Nassodonta gravelyi Preston, 1916: synonym of Nassodonta annesleyi (Benson, 1860)

References

 Adams, H. (1867). Descriptions of six new species of shells, and note on Opisthostoma de-Crespignii. Proceedings of the Zoological Society of London. 1866: 445–447.

External links
 Kantor Yu.I. & Kilburn R.B. (2001) Rediscovery of Canidia dorri Wattebled, 1886, with discussion of its systematic position (Gastropoda: Neogastropoda: Nassariidae: Nassodonta). The Nautilus 115(3): 99-104
 Strong E.E., Galindo L.A. & Kantor Yu.I. (2017). Quid est Clea helena? Evidence for a previously unrecognized radiation of assassin snails (Gastropoda: Buccinoidea: Nassariidae). PeerJ. 5: e3638.

Nassariidae